The International Assessment and Strategy Center is a United States-based think tank whose declared purpose is to analyze "medium and long-term security issues and their impact on the security of the United States and her key interests and allies." Headquartered in Alexandria, Virginia, the Center undertakes both open source and classified work on behalf of United States government agencies, and non-governmental organizations. Officially non-partisan, the Center's policy orientation has been generally geared toward a "robust national security posture".

Current and former staff
 Jeffrey Breinholt
 Kenneth E. deGraffenreid
 Douglas Farah
 Arthur Waldron
 Glenn R. Simpson

References

Foreign policy and strategy think tanks in the United States
Political and economic think tanks in the United States
Security studies
Think tanks established in 2004
Organizations based in Alexandria, Virginia
2004 establishments in the United States